Plainfield High School - Central Campus, or PHS-CC, is a four-year public high school in Plainfield, Illinois, a southwest suburb of Chicago, Illinois, in the United States. It is part of Plainfield Community Consolidated School District 202, which also includes three other high schools: Plainfield South High School, Plainfield North High School and Plainfield East High School.

Campus history

The original building was destroyed by one of the worst tornadoes in Illinois history.
The Plainfield Tornado, which was rated an F5, struck the town on August 28, 1990, one day before classes were scheduled to begin.
Three faculty and staff members lost their lives during this storm.
Had school been in session, casualties could have been even more grave, as the tornado hit the school directly.
In the middle of the 1992–1993 school year students moved into the new PHS building.
At the time, it was one of the most technically advanced high schools in the state of Illinois, complete with its own observatory.

In 1998, the school added a "Freshman Center" with its own gymnasium and cafeteria.
The new freshman center has three floors and is connected to the main building by an enclosed catwalk.

In 2005, the school constructed a new snack building and restrooms on the south end of the football–track stadium.
In 2007, a new home grandstand was constructed, replacing the visitors' seating on the west side of the football field, and the former home grandstand was converted into visitor seating.
The new home grandstand was built using only steel, contrasting with the former home seating which was constructed of brick and concrete.
The grandstand opening had been planned for the pre-season 'Green and White Night' event, but construction set-backs led to its opening about one month late.

With the addition of a larger home grandstand, shot put and discus fields were relocated further west, behind the new grandstand.

Also in 2007, the faculty installed over 300 high-resolution wireless cameras to monitor the campus.
New computer security measures were implemented which block some internet proxy servers, game-related sites, and other sites that the school district felt distracted their students from the educational process.

The school replaced all its computers and monitors with Dell computers with LCD screens.
In the 2008-2009 school year, classroom projectors that could display what was on the current teacher's computer were installed.

On June 9, 2008, severe weather resulted in damage to the tennis court fences and school roof.
There were no confirmed reports of a tornado.

Athletics & Activities

Athletics
Plainfield Central competes in the Southwest Prairie Conference and is a member of the Illinois High School Association.
The school fields teams in the following sports during the following seasons.

 Fall: Boys & Girls Cross Country, Boys Football, Boys & Girls Golf, Boys Soccer, Girls Swimming & Diving, Girls Tennis, Girls Volleyball
 Winter: Boys & Girls Basketball, Boys & Girls Bowling, Boys Swimming & Diving, Boys Wrestling, Competitive Cheerleading, Competitive Dance, Hockey
 Spring: Boys Baseball, Boys Tennis, Boys Track & Field, Boys Volleyball, Girls Badminton, Girls Softball, Girls Soccer, Girls Track & Field, Boys and Girls Lacrosse

Despite being able to trace its existence back to 1891, Plainfield Central has never won a team state championship.

Hall of Fame
In the spring of 1998, the high school established its athletic hall of fame to honor athletes, coaches, boosters, and fans who have made significant contributions to the athletic programs. The first class was inducted in 1999.

Activities
Plainfield Central competes in the following IHSA sponsored activities: 
 Bass Fishing
 Chess 
 Drama 
 Speech
 Journalism
 Marching Band
 Vocal
 Scholastic Bowl

Clubs and organizations
Plainfield Central has the following clubs and organizations:
Armed Forces Club
Art Club
Bio Explorations
Chess Club
Fellowship of Christian Athletes
French Club
German Club
Green and White Review
GSA
History Through Film Club
Interact Club
Key Club
Lacrosse Club
Link Crew
Math Competition Club
Music Production Club
National Honor Society
Orchesis Dance Company
Promoting Equality and Acceptance at Central for Everyone (P.E.A.C.E)
Spanish Club
Student Council
Tech Crew
The Fielder - school newspaper
WALC
Yearbook
E Sports Club

References

External links
 Official website
 Plainfield High School Hockey Association Website

Public high schools in Illinois
Plainfield, Illinois
Schools in Will County, Illinois